Taljhari is a village in the Taljhari CD block in the Rajmahal subdivision of the Sahibganj district in the Indian state of Jharkhand.

Geography

Location                                           

Demographics
According to the 2011 Census of India, Taljhari had a total population of 1,377, of which 691 (50%) were males and 688 (50%) were females. Population in the age range 0–6 years was 229. The total number of literate persons in Taljhari was 701 (61.06% of the population over 6 years).

Civic administration

Police station
Taljhari police station serves the Taljhari CD block.

CD block HQ
Headquarters of Taljhari CD block is at Taljhari village.

Education
Model School Taljhari is an English-medium coeducational institution established in 2011. It has facilities for teaching from class VI to class XII.

Project Girls High School is a ?-medium girls only institution established in 1985. It has facilities for teaching from class VII to class X.

Government Girls High School is a Hindi-medium girls only institution established in 1965. It has facilities for teaching from class I to class X.

Kasturba Gandhi Balika Vidyalaya Taljhari is a Hindi-medium girls only institution established in 2005. It has facilities for teaching from class VI to class XII.

References

Villages in Sahibganj district